Christian W.E. Haub (born 1964) is a German billionaire businessman. He is the CEO of the Tengelmann Group, the chairman and president of Emil Capital Partners and a former director and CEO of Montvale, New Jersey's Great Atlantic and Pacific Tea Company from December 1991 to February 2002.

As of August 2021, Haub has an estimated net worth of US$2.9 billion.

Haub is a partner and CEO of Tengelmann. Haub is a director of Metro Inc., Montreal, Quebec, Canada, and was a director of the Food Marketing Institute, and director of BrightFarms as of 2015.

In A&P, was CEO (since May 1998), executive chairman (since August 2005) and chair of the executive committee (since May 2001). In addition, Haub was president from December 1993 through February 2002, and from November 2002 through November 2004.

Other roles
Haub is a member at the Boston College board of trustees, an advisory board member of the Schulich School of Business at York University in Canada and a former member of the board of trustees of St. Joseph's University in Philadelphia, Pennsylvania.

In 2009, Haub was honored as Grand Marshal at the German-American Steuben Parade in New York City, the largest celebration of German-American friendship in the US. Haub has in the past collaborated with The Children's Health Fund.

In December 2014, the Tacoma Art Museum unveiled its new Haub Family Galleries wing, following Erivan and Helga Haub's donation of $20 million and 295 pieces of Western art to the institution. The galleries have become one of the foremost collections of Western art in North America.

In 2015, Haub and his wife, Liliane, were awarded the James F. Cleary '50, H'93 Masters Award from Boston College for helping to "engage a growing network of current-student parents with BC" and spreading "the message of BC's increasing reputation for excellence".

Personal life
Haub is married to Liliane; they have four children and live in Munich, Germany.

References

Living people
American chief executives of food industry companies
American people of German descent
The Great Atlantic & Pacific Tea Company
1964 births
Christian
German billionaires
American billionaires